John Hackett (1865–1940) was an Irish politician.

He was an MP, representing the Irish Parliamentary Party, for Mid Tipperary, from January 1910 until December 1918.

External links

 

1865 births
1940 deaths
Members of the Parliament of the United Kingdom for County Tipperary constituencies (1801–1922)
Irish Parliamentary Party MPs
UK MPs 1910
UK MPs 1910–1918